R. C. "Perry" Burke (born c.1920) is a former West Indies cricket umpire from Jamaica. He stood in six Test matches between 1954 and 1960. Overall, he umpired 14 first-class matches, all of them in Kingston, Jamaica, between 1948 and 1960.

During England's tour to the West Indies in 1953–54, Burke gave John Holt out lbw in the first Test in Kingston. As a result, Burke's family was attacked in the crowd.

Burke's father, Sam, was also an umpire.

Outside of cricket, Burke worked in a government printing office in Kingston.

See also
 List of Test cricket umpires

References

Year of birth uncertain
Possibly living people
Place of birth missing (living people)
West Indian Test cricket umpires